Baron Crawshaw, of Crawshaw in the County Palatine of Lancaster and of Whatton in the County of Leicester is a title in the Peerage of the United Kingdom. It was created on 25 August 1892 for Sir Thomas Brooks, 1st Baronet. He notably served as High Sheriff of Lancashire in 1884. Brooks had already been created a baronet in the Baronetage of the United Kingdom, of Crawshaw Hall and Whatton House, on 9 February 1891.  the titles are held by his great-grandson, the fifth Baron, who succeeded his elder brother in 1997.

The family seat is Whatton House near Loughborough in Leicestershire.

Barons Crawshaw (1892)
Thomas Brooks, 1st Baron Crawshaw  (15 May 1825 – 5 February 1908)
William Brooks, 2nd Baron Crawshaw  (16 October 1853 – 19 January 1929)
Gerald Beach Brooks, 3rd Baron Crawshaw  (1 April 1884 – 21 October 1946)
William Michael Clifton Brooks, 4th Baron Crawshaw  (25 March 1933 – 7 November 1997)
David Gerald Brooks, 5th Baron Crawshaw  (born 14 September 1934–)

The heir presumptive is the present holder's nephew, Edward Samuel Brooks (b. 1969).
Next in line is the present holder's cousin Timothy Allan William Brooks (b. 1962), grandson of Hon. Herbert William Brooks (1890-1974), the younger son of the 2nd Baron. He has a daughter, Sophie (b. 2002) and a son, Rupert James (b. 2003).

Coat of arms

Notes

References

Attribution
Kidd, Charles & Williamson, David (editors). Debrett's Peerage and Baronetage (1990 edition). New York: St Martin's Press, 1990, 

Baronies in the Peerage of the United Kingdom
Noble titles created in 1892